This Is It is the 1999 album by Jimmy Ibbotson.

Track listing
"Try Not To Cry" (Tracy McLain)
"Drive It Like It Is" (Tracy McLain, B. Vitany)
"Wheels" (Gram Parsons, Chris Hillman)
"Patch It Up" (T. Schuyler, W. T. Davidson)
"They're Tearing My Little Town Down" (R. Nielson)
"Winnie's Song" (Tracy McLain)
"Mrs. Hiss's House" (Jimmy Ibbotson)
"Another Daddy" (Jimmy Ibbotson)
"I Was a Fool" (Jimmy Ibbotson)
"Coming of the Roads" (B. Wheeler)

Personnel
Jimmy Ibbotson: guitar, mandolin, vocals
Tracy McLain: vocals

References

1999 albums
Jimmy Ibbotson albums